Paul Henrik Thorbjorn Thorlakson,  (October 5, 1895 – October 19, 1989) was a Canadian physician and Chancellor of the University of Winnipeg.

Paul Thorlaksonwas born in Park River, North Dakota and  grew up in Selkirk, Manitoba.  He was the third child of the Reverend Neils Steingrimur Thorlákson (1857-1943), who was an immigrant from Iceland and  Erika Christopha Rynning (1860-1947), who was born  in Norway. He father was a minister in the Lutheran Church who served the congregations in Minnesota, North Dakota, and Manitoba.

During World War I he was a medical sergeant. After the war he received his medical degree from the University of Manitoba in 1919. He subsequently undertook his post-graduate studies in surgery in London, England. He co-founded the Maclean-Thorlakson clinic, renamed the Winnipeg Clinic in 1938, one of the earliest multi-speciality private group practice clinics in Canada. He was surgeon-in-chief at the Winnipeg General Hospital and professor of surgery at the University of Manitoba. In 1969 he was elected Chancellor of the University of Winnipeg. Dr. Thorlakson served three terms as chancellor of the University of Winnipeg.  He also became a governor of the American College of Surgeons.  In 1974, he was the official representative of the Government of Canada to the celebrations marking the 1100th anniversary of the settlement of Iceland.

Honours
 In 1939 he was named Knight of the Order of the Falcon and was promoted to Commander in 1951.
 He received honorary doctorates from the University of Manitoba (1952), University of Iceland (1961), Brandon University (1970), and University of Winnipeg (1979).
 In 1970 he was made a Companion of the Order of Canada.

References

External links
Paul H.T. Thorlakson (Canadian Encyclopedia) 

1895 births
1989 deaths
Canadian surgeons
Canadian military doctors
Canadian soldiers
Canadian university and college chancellors
Companions of the Order of Canada
University of Winnipeg alumni
American emigrants to Canada
Recipients of the Order of the Falcon
People from Walsh County, North Dakota
Canadian people of Icelandic descent
Canadian people of Norwegian descent
20th-century surgeons